Bruno Saile (born 1 March 1952 in Thalwil) is a Swiss rower. He won the gold medal in the coxless four at the 1982 World Rowing Championships.

External links 
 
 

1952 births
Living people
Swiss male rowers
Olympic rowers of Switzerland
Rowers at the 1980 Summer Olympics
Rowers at the 1984 Summer Olympics
Rowers at the 1988 Summer Olympics
People from Thalwil
World Rowing Championships medalists for Switzerland
Sportspeople from the canton of Zürich